Rolando Adrián Carlen (born 11 November 1966) is an Argentine football manager and former player who played as a forward.

Playing career
Carlen was born in Santa Fe, and made his senior debut with hometown side Unión de Santa Fe. After playing for Guaraní Antonio Franco, he moved to Canada in 1991, and joined America United.

Carlen subsequently represented Toronto International also in Canada before moving back to his home country in 1993 with Argentino de Quilmes. He retired in 1996 with the latter club, aged 30.

Managerial career
Carlen started his managerial career with Ateneo Inmaculada in 1997. He was subsequently in charge of Atlético Pilar from 1999 until 2001, and later became Juan Antonio Pizzi's assistant at Colón in 2005.

Carlen returned to managerial duties in February 2006, after being appointed in charge of Gimnasia y Esgrima de Santa Fe. He resigned in February 2008, and subsequently returned to Colón as a manager of the youth setup.

In 2011, Carlen was Mario Sciacqua's assistant at Colón. He moved to San Lorenzo in 2012 to work in Pizzi's staff, and remained with the manager in the following years, at Valencia, León, the Chile national team and the Saudi Arabia national team. Both returned to San Lorenzo in 2019.

On 12 January 2021, Carlen was presented as manager of Uruguayan club Cerro.

References

External links

1966 births
Living people
Footballers from Santa Fe, Argentina
Argentine footballers
Association football forwards
Argentine Primera División players
Primera Nacional players
Unión de Santa Fe footballers
Argentino de Quilmes players
Argentine expatriate footballers
Argentine expatriate sportspeople in Canada
Expatriate soccer players in Canada
Argentine football managers
C.A. Cerro managers
Argentine expatriate football managers
Argentine expatriate sportspeople in Peru
Argentine expatriate sportspeople in Spain
Argentine expatriate sportspeople in Mexico
Argentine expatriate sportspeople in Chile
Argentine expatriate sportspeople in Saudi Arabia
Argentine expatriate sportspeople in Uruguay
Expatriate football managers in Uruguay